WHUN (1150 kHz) is a classic hits AM radio station serving the Huntingdon, Pennsylvania area. As of June 28, 2018, the station is known as "97.7 103.1 103.5 WOWY, simulcasting WOWY 103.1 FM State College and WHUN-FM 103.5 Huntingdon. WHUN is owned by Kristin Cantrell and the broadcast license is held by Southern Belle, LLC.

History
WHUN began as WHUN in 1947, and among its original personnel was Cary H. Simpson, who assisted in building the station and would later build a series of his own stations in central and northern Pennsylvania.

For many years, WHUN's ownership would be relatively unchanged, with the station and its FM sister, WLAK (103.5 FM), which would come on the air years later, staying in the Biddle and McMeen families until the stations were sold in the mid-1990s to BARDCOM of Mount Union, Pa. From 1994-2002, WHUN was the sister station of WXMJ 99.5 FM (Majic 99). Both stations were sold to Forever Broadcasting in 2002.

The station's call sign was changed to WLLI on February 8, 2010, and from 2010 to 2012, the station was a country music station known as Willy AM 1150. On December 31, 2012, the format changed to sports radio, and the station became known as ESPN Radio 1150. The call sign was changed back to WHUN on January 2, 2013.

Effective September 1, 2015, Forever Broadcasting sold WHUN and sister station WHUN-FM (106.3 FM) to Southern Belle, LLC for $100,000.

In 2016, WHUN’s format changed from sports to a simulcast of classic hits-formatted WHUN-FM (103.5 FM).

On June 28, 2019, WHUN and WHUN-FM switched to a simulcast of oldies WOWY 97.1 FM University Park.

On August 24, 2021, WOWY, WHUN, and WHUN-FM completed their evolution from 60s-70s oldies to 70s-80s classic hits.

Repeaters

References

External links

HUN (AM)
Classic hits radio stations in the United States
Radio stations established in 1947
1947 establishments in Pennsylvania